Salmon Mountain is located in the Klamath Mountains of California and is the highest point in Humboldt County. The area is protected in the Trinity Alps Wilderness on the Six Rivers National Forest.

References

External links 
 
 

Mountains of Humboldt County, California
Mountains of Siskiyou County, California
Mountains of Trinity County, California
Mountains of Northern California